Events from the year 1925 in art.

Events
 February 23 – Stanley Spencer marries Hilda Carline.
 March 31 – The Bauhaus closes in Weimar and moves to Dessau.
 April–October – In Paris, the Ministry of Commerce and Industry sponsors the International Exposition of Modern Industrial and Decorative Arts; the event gives a name to the Art Deco style. Le Corbusier's Pavillon d'Esprit Nouveau is so disliked by the organizers that they erect a six-meter-high fence around it.
 May 9 – Josef Albers marries Anni Fleischmann.
 September 17 – Frida Kahlo is seriously and permanently injured when a bus in which she is riding collides with a trolleycar in Mexico City; she takes up painting while immobilized following the accident.
 Autumn – Alfred Stieglitz and Georgia O'Keeffe move to an upper-floor apartment in the Shelton Towers Hotel, New York City from where they begin to photograph and paint the views. This year also, Stieglitz begins taking his Equivalents series of abstract cloud photographs.
 November 13/14 (midnight) – First Surrealist exhibition opens at the Galerie Pierre, Paris.
 Franz Roh's Nach Expressionismus – Magischer Realismus: Probleme der neuesten europäischen Malerei ("After Expressionism – Magical Realism: Problems of the newest European painting") is published, introducing the term magic realism into cultural criticism.

Awards
 Archibald Prize: John Longstaff – Portrait of Maurice Moscovitch

Works

Paintings
 George Adomeit – Down to the Harbor
 Pierre Bonnard – Nude at the Toilet Table
 Henry Clive – Sultana (approximate year)
 Lovis Corinth – Ecce homo
 Otto Dix – Portrait of the Dancer Anita Berber
 Arthur Dove – The Critic
 Lyonel Feininger – Barfüßerkirche in Erfurt I (Staatsgalerie Stuttgart)
 Rudolf Frentz – Horsewoman
 George Grosz – Portrait of the Writer Max Herrmann-Neisse
 Edward Hopper – House by the Railroad
 Wassily Kandinsky – Yellow-Red-Blue; Three Elements
 Tamara de Lempicka – Autoportrait (Tamara in a Green Bugatti)
 Joan Miró – Head of a Catalan Peasant (sequence completed) and The Birth of the World
 Hilda Rix Nicholas – Les fleurs dédaignées
 Pablo Picasso – The Three Dancers
 the three graces
   The three graces
 Veno Pilon – Russian Woman
 Georg Schrimpf – Martha Reading a Letter
 Charles Sheeler – Still Life
 Alexej von Jawlensky – Abstract Head: Desire
 Xu Beihong – Jiang Biwei by a table

Sculptures

 Wäinö Aaltonen – Statue of Paavo Nurmi
 Josep Clarà – Serenity
 Jacob Epstein – Rima (memorial to W. H. Hudson in Hyde Park, London)
 Emmanuel Frémiet – Equestrian statue of Joan of Arc (Portland, Oregon)
 Daniel Chester French – Statue of Abraham Lincoln (Lincoln Memorial, Washington, D.C.)
 Alberto Giacometti – Torso
 Charles Sargeant Jagger – Royal Artillery Memorial
 Paul Manship – Actaeon, Diana, and The Flight of Europa
 Frederick Roth – Statue of Balto, Central Park
 Francis Derwent Wood – Machine Gun Corps Memorial

Births
 1 January
Mario Merz, Italian artist (d. 2003).
Kossa Bokchan, Serbian painter (d. 2009).
 17 January – Duane Hanson, American sculptor (d. 1996).
 23 January – James Bingham, Northern Irish painter (d. 2009).
 12 February – Joan Mitchell, American Abstract Expressionist painter (d. 1992).
 22 February – Edward Gorey, American illustrator (d. 2000).
 10 March – Ed van der Elsken, Dutch photographer (d. 1990).
 13 March – Jane Bown, English portrait photographer (d. 2014).
 25 March - José Manuel Capuletti (d. 1978
 29 March – Sava Stojkov, Serbian painter (d. 2014).
 1 April – Bryan Robertson, English curator (d. 2002).
 4 April – Emmett Williams, American poet and Fluxus artist (d. 2007).
 29 April – Iwao Takamoto, Japanese American animator, television producer and film director (d. 2007).
 16 May – Hannes Hegen, German cartoonist and illustrator (d. 2014).
 22 May – Jean Tinguely, Swiss painter and sculptor (d. 1991).
 21 June – Stanley Moss, American poet, publisher and art dealer
 23 July – Burt Glinn, American photographer (d. 2008).
 26 August – Robert Colescott, American artist (d. 2009).
 22 October – Robert Rauschenberg, American artist (d. 2008).
 28 October – Ian Hamilton Finlay, Scottish poet, writer, artist and gardener (d. 2006).
 15 November – André Lufwa, Congolese sculptor (Batteur de tam-tam) (d. 2020).
 11 December – Patrick Reyntiens, English stained glass artist (d. 2021)
 18 December – John Szarkowski, American photographer, curator, historian and critic (d. 2007).
 date unknown  - Panayiotis Tetsis, Greek painter.

Deaths
 January 8 – George Bellows, American realist painter (b. 1882)
 March 1 – Ramon Pichot, Catalan impressionist painter, mentor of Salvador Dalí (b. 1871)
 March 8 – Juliette Wytsman, Belgian painter (b. 1866)
 April 14 – John Singer Sargent, expatriate American portrait painter (b. 1856)
 April 25
 Emily Mary Osborn, English painter (b. 1828)
 John Quinton Pringle, Scottish painter (b. 1864)
 May 2 – Jan Štursa, Czech sculptor (b. 1880)
 July 17 – Lovis Corinth, German painter and printmaker (b. 1858)
 July 28 – Léon Augustin Lhermitte, French genre painter (b. 1844)
 August 15 – George Barbu Știrbei, Romanian patron of the arts (b. 1828)
 August 21 – Karl Brendel, German schizophrenic outsider artist (b. 1871)
 September 17 – Carl Eytel, German American artist (b. 1862)
 September 25 – Charles Cottet, French post-impressionist painter (b. 1863)
 October 21 – Heinrich von Angeli, Austrian society portrait painter (b. 1840)
 November 27 – Roger de La Fresnaye, French cubist painter (b. 1885)
 c. November – Percy Hetherington Fitzgerald, Irish literary biographer, drama critic and sculptor (b. 1834)
 December 18 – Sir Hamo Thornycroft, English figure sculptor (b. 1850)
 December 29 – Félix Vallotton, Swiss French painter and graphic artist (b. 1865)
 date unknown – Vladislav Titelbah, Serbian painter (b. 1847).

See also
 1925 in fine arts of the Soviet Union

References

 
Years of the 20th century in art
1920s in art